Patchwork Girl is a work of electronic literature by American author Shelley Jackson. It was written in Storyspace and published by Eastgate Systems in 1995. It is often discussed along with Michael Joyce's afternoon, a story as an important work of hypertext fiction.

"Shelley Jackson's brilliantly realized hypertext Patchwork Girl is an electronic fiction that manages to be at once highly original and intensely parasitic on its print predecessors."

Plot and structure 
Jackson's Patchwork Girl tells the story through illustrations of parts of a female body that are stitched together through text and image. The narrative of the story is divided into five segments, titled: "a Graveyard", "a Journal", "a Quilt", "a Story", and "& broken accents." The goal of the piece is to not only make the reader realize the structure of the Patchwork Girl as a whole but also realize all the pieces that must be "patched" together in order to create one unified structure. Each segment leads down a trail that takes the story in multiple directions through various linking words and images. Jackson uses recurring graveyard imagery in order to continually invite the reader to resurrect Mary Shelley's monster.

In Mary Shelley's original, Victor Frankenstein begins the creation of a female companion for his monster, but destroys the second effort prior to completion. In Jackson's version, the female monster is completed by Mary Shelley herself. The woman and her creation become lovers; the creature then travels to America, where she pursues a variety of adventures before disintegrating after a 175-year lifetime. Individual sections also explore the lives of some of the women whose corpses contributed body parts to the creature. The work is an oft-cited example of cyberfeminism—"If you want to see the whole," one passage reads, "you will have to piece me together yourself." Furthermore, Jackson's use of hypertext "enables us to recognize the degree to which the qualities of collage—particularly those of appropriation, assemblage, concatenation, and the blurring of limits, edges, and borders—characterize a good deal of the way we conceive of gender and identity."

In reflecting on the structural impact of hypertext on Patchwork Girl, Jackson wrote:

Influences
The narrative is based on two books: Mary Shelley's Frankenstein and The Patchwork Girl of Oz by L. Frank Baum.

Jackson's work includes quotations from the novels of both Shelley and Baum, plus material from Jacques Derrida, Donna Haraway, and other writers.

Patchwork Girl is categorized as a Borgesian structure of information, due to its non-linearity. The work reflects the hypertext labyrinth originally expressed in Borges' "Garden of Forking Paths", since the choices in the narrative allow multiple paths of experience.

The Gothic
Patchwork Girl is a continuation of Mary Shelley's Frankenstein, and therefore definitively a Gothic tale. There is much emphasis placed on the gruesome sewing-together of Patchwork Girl and the functioning of her borrowed body. The structure and the content of the text closely reflect one another because the piecing-together of Patchwork Girl's physical self features in the narrative as well as the interactive element of the hypertext.

Award nominations
Patchwork Girl was shortlisted for the Electronic Literature Organization fiction award in 2001.

References

External links 
Patchwork Girl
Shelley Jackson's Patchwork Girl: An Overview
Review
Flickering Connectivities in Shelley Jackson's Patchwork Girl: The Importance of Media-Specific Analysis, by N. Katherine Hayles
Screen capture video of reading Patchwork Girl

Hypertext
Electronic literature works
Gothic fiction
Frankenstein novels
1995 American novels
1995 novels
1995 science fiction novels